Patrick M. McCarthy is a cardiac surgeon, executive director of the Bluhm Cardiovascular Institute at Northwestern Medicine, the first Heller-Sacks Professor of Surgery at Northwestern University Feinberg School of Medicine, chief of the Division of Cardiac Surgery at Northwestern Memorial Hospital, and professor of Biomedical Engineering at Northwestern University McCormick School of Engineering. Through his work with the School of Engineering, McCarthy serves as a Farley Fellow.

Education
McCarthy obtained his undergraduate degree at University of Notre Dame, then attended Loyola University Stritch School of Medicine for his medical degree. He completed a residency in general surgery and a fellowship in thoracic and cardiovascular surgery at Mayo Clinic, and a fellowship in cardiovascular transplantation at Stanford University.

Career 
McCarthy joined the Mayo Clinic in 1980. After eight years at the Mayo Clinic, McCarthy worked at Stanford University Medical Center for 18 months before joining the Cleveland Clinic in 1990. McCarthy was at Cleveland Clinic for 14 years.

In 2004, McCarthy moved back to Chicago and joined the Northwestern University Feinberg School of Medicine as the first Heller-Sacks Professor of Cardiothoracic Surgery and as executive director of the new Bluhm Cardiovascular Institute, which had been created with a $10M donation from billionaire philanthropist Neil Bluhm, who recruited McCarthy. As of 2017 the institute had received about $60 million in donations, and about one-third came from Bluhm.

Inventions 
McCarthy co-founded a company called Cardiac Valve Innovations in 2015, directed to improving heart valve repair rings.

D-EtLogix Ring
McCarthy is the inventor of the Edward's D-EtLogix Ring, formally known as the Myxo ETlogix ring. The D-EtLogix Ring is a modification of an earlier device, the Geoform ring, approved by the Food and Drug Administration (FDA). FDA policy permits minor modifications without regulatory approval.

Two patients brought a lawsuit against McCarthy, accusing him of experimenting with the ring on them without their knowledge, and concealing evidence of complications.  One patient dropped their suit and the other patient brought their suit to trial. The jury decided that the charges brought by the patient had no merit.

References

External links
Official web page at Northwestern University Feinberg School of Medicine

Living people
American cardiac surgeons
University of Notre Dame alumni
Loyola University Chicago alumni
Northwestern University faculty
Year of birth missing (living people)